Jerome Isaac Friedman (born March 28, 1930) is an American physicist. He is Institute Professor and Professor of Physics, Emeritus, at the Massachusetts Institute of Technology. He won the 1990 Nobel Prize in Physics along with Henry Kendall and Richard Taylor, "for their pioneering investigations concerning deep inelastic scattering of electrons on protons and bound neutrons, which have been of essential importance for the development of the quark model in particle physics.", work which showed an internal structure for protons later known to be quarks. Friedman sits on the Board of Sponsors of the Bulletin of the Atomic Scientists.

Life and career
Born in Chicago, Illinois to Lillian (née Warsaw) and Selig Friedman, a sewing machine salesman, Friedman's Jewish parents emigrated to the U.S. from Russia. Jerome Friedman excelled in art but became interested in physics after reading a book on relativity written by Albert Einstein. He turned down a scholarship to the Art Institute of Chicago in order to study physics at the University of Chicago. Whilst there he worked under Enrico Fermi, and eventually received his Ph.D. in physics in 1956. In 1960, he joined the physics faculty of the Massachusetts Institute of Technology.

In 1968–69, commuting between MIT and California, he conducted experiments with Henry W. Kendall and Richard E. Taylor at the Stanford Linear Accelerator Center which gave the first experimental evidence that protons had an internal structure, later known to be quarks. For this, Friedman, Kendall and Taylor shared the 1990 Nobel Prize in Physics. He is an Institute Professor at the Massachusetts Institute of Technology.  Friedman is also a member of the Board of Sponsors of the Bulletin of the Atomic Scientists.

In 2003, he was one of 22 Nobel laureates who signed the Humanist Manifesto. He is an atheist.

Friedman is one of the 20 American recipients of the Nobel Prize in Physics to sign a letter addressed to President George W. Bush in May 2008, urging him to "reverse the damage done to basic science research in the Fiscal Year 2008 Omnibus Appropriations Bill" by requesting additional emergency funding for the Department of Energy’s Office of Science, the National Science Foundation, and the National Institute of Standards and Technology.

In 2008, Friedman received an honorary Ph.D. from the University of Belgrade. He is an honorary professor at the  University of Belgrade's Faculty of Physics and the Faculty's institutes: Institute of Physics, Institute of Physics, Zemun and Vinca Nuclear Institute.

Publications
 Friedman, J. I., Kendall, H. W., et al. "Experimental Search for a Heavy Electron", Massachusetts Institute of Technology, United States Department of Energy (through predecessor agency the Atomic Energy Commission) September 1967.
 Friedman, J. I. "Deep Inelastic Electron Scattering: Experimental", Massachusetts Institute of Technology, United States Department of Energy (through predecessor agency the Atomic Energy Commission) October 1971.

Honors 
 Grand Cordon of the Order of the Rising Sun (2016)
Member of the American Philosophical Society (2002)
Member of the National Academy of Sciences (1992)
Golden Plate Award of the American Academy of Achievement (1991)
Member of the American Academy of Arts and Sciences (1980)

See also
 List of Jewish Nobel laureates

References

External links

 Oral history interview transcript with Jerome Friedman on 12 August 2020, American Institute of Physics, Niels Bohr Library & Archives
  including the Nobel Lecture, December 8, 1990 Deep Inelastic Scattering: Comparisons with the Quark Model
 Friedman page at MIT
 Jerome Friedman Playlist Appearance on WMBR's Dinnertime Sampler  radio show January 5, 2005
 Friedman Explains Role of Quarks in Killian Talk, Massachusetts Institute of Technology, (April 1, 2001)
 Will Innovation Flourish in the Future? Opinion by Jerome Friedman, American Institute of Physics

Experimental physicists
1930 births
Living people
Nobel laureates in Physics
American Nobel laureates
Members of the United States National Academy of Sciences
Winners of the Panofsky Prize
Massachusetts Institute of Technology School of Science faculty
Academic staff of the University of Belgrade
Jewish American atheists
American people of Russian-Jewish descent
Jewish American scientists
Jewish physicists
21st-century American physicists
20th-century American physicists
University of Chicago alumni
Members of the American Philosophical Society
Presidents of the American Physical Society